Daniel Joseph Griffin (March 26, 1880 – December 11, 1926) was a lawyer and Democratic  politician from New York. He was a U.S. Representative from 1913 through 1917.

Biography
He was born in Brooklyn, New York, attended parochial schools there, and then St. Laurent College near Montreal, Quebec, Canada, and St. Peter's College in Jersey City.

Legal career 
Griffin graduated in law from the New York Law School. After he was admitted to the bar in 1902, he commenced practice in Brooklyn. Between 1903 and 1906, he also served as commissioner of licenses for the Borough of Brooklyn. After that he was head of the administration and guardianship departments of the Surrogate's Court of Kings County from 1906 to 1912.

Congress 
He was a delegate to the 1912 Democratic National Convention, and was also the Democratic candidate for U.S. Representative from New York's 8th congressional district. He was elected, taking office in March 1913. He was re-elected in 1914 and 1916.

Law enforcement 
In 1917, he was elected Sheriff of Kings County, New York. He resigned as Representative on 31 December to assume his new office the next day. He served as sheriff for two years. After leaving office he resumed the practice of law.

Death 
He died in Brooklyn, New York, on December 11, 1926 and was interred in Holy Cross Cemetery, Brooklyn.

References

 

1880 births
1926 deaths
Saint Peter's University alumni
New York Law School alumni
Democratic Party members of the United States House of Representatives from New York (state)
Sheriffs of Kings County, New York
People from Brooklyn
20th-century American politicians